Normality is a 3D graphic adventure, released in June 1996 by Gremlin Interactive. All cut-scenes in the game are pre-rendered. The game's engine was later used in the game Realms of the Haunting. It was re-released in 2011 with Microsoft Windows support on GOG.com, with macOS support following in 2013 and Linux support in 2014.

Plot
The story revolves around Kent Knutson, a rebellious teenager in the city of Neutropolis, from which various places take up the setting of the game. Neutropolis, a once thriving and vibrant city, is now a dark and polluted police state in which any kind of fun is prohibited. When the game begins, Kent is released after having been imprisoned by the "Norms", the city's police force, for whistling a happy tune while walking down the street. While in prison, he receives a note from an anonymous inmate telling him about the underground insurrection group that he might want to join.

After being released from jail, the player starts the game in Kent's apartment, having to go find and join this resistance group. After winning the trust of the resistance group Kent must assist them in overthrowing the dictator Paul who is responsible for the city's sorry state, in which his twin brother Saul was rumored to be dead because of him.

Release
Normality was self-published in the United Kingdom by Gremlin Interactive. It had a small credited voice cast. Interplay handled publishing duties in the US and decided to entirely replace the voice cast with a broader range of actors that it felt would appeal more to the US market. This included casting Corey Feldman in the role of the main character.

Reception 

Reviewing the game in Maximum, Rich Leadbetter praised the rendered intro, the believability of the 3D environment, the setting, and the user-friendly interface, while criticizing the dull scenario and repetitive speech. He concluded, "Although technically innovative and visually impressive, this one is for adventure fans only." A reviewer for Next Generation said the free roaming, real-time 3D environment is an impressive change of pace for the adventure genre, but feels incongruous in light of the fact that the game does not allow any interaction beyond what is traditionally seen in adventure games. He complimented the puzzles as being logical and not overly difficult, but added that veteran adventure gamers might find them too easy because of that. He summarized the game as "at least mildly fun and entertaining."

Scorpia of Computer Gaming World had a generally favorable opinion of Normality, although she disliked its load times and certain interface bugs. She summarized, "Overall, though, Normality isn't bad."

Trivia 

 Violet Berlin, the Bad Influence! presenter, makes an appearance in this game.
 Former 1UP.com Editor-In-Chief and What They Play founder, John Davison, contributed music to Normality during his music days.

References

External links 
 
 

1996 video games
Adventure games
Point-and-click adventure games
Cyberpunk video games
DOS games
First-person adventure games
Gremlin Interactive games
Interplay Entertainment games
Linux games
MacOS games
Single-player video games
Video games set in prison
Windows games
Games commercially released with DOSBox
Video games scored by Patrick Phelan
Video games developed in the United Kingdom